Major golf championship may refer to:

 Men's major golf championships
 Women's major golf championships
 Senior major golf championships
 Senior women's major golf championships